Two ships in the United States Navy have been named USS Ringgold, in honor of Rear Admiral Cadwalader Ringgold (1802–1867).

In 1940, she was transferred to the Royal Navy and renamed HMS Newark. She was scrapped in 1947.
In 1959, she was transferred to the German Navy and renamed Z-2. In 1981, she was transferred to the Greek Navy and renamed Kimon. She was scrapped in 1993.

United States Navy ship names